Alan Stulin (born 5 June 1990) is a Polish professional football who plays as a full back for UNA Strassen. He has dual Polish-German nationality.

Career
In July 2012, he signed a one-year contract with GKS Bełchatów.

In June 2019, after a season with Alemannia Aachen, Stulin joined Luxembourg National Division side UNA Strassen on a three-year deal.

References

External links
 
 

1990 births
Polish footballers
Polish emigrants to Germany
German people of Polish descent
Poland youth international footballers
Poland under-21 international footballers
1. FC Kaiserslautern players
GKS Bełchatów players
Wormatia Worms players
Alemannia Aachen players
FC UNA Strassen players
Living people
People from Bolesławiec
Sportspeople from Lower Silesian Voivodeship
Association football defenders
Regionalliga players
Luxembourg National Division players
Polish expatriate footballers
Expatriate footballers in Germany
Polish expatriate sportspeople in Germany
Expatriate footballers in Luxembourg